Aurtis Whitley CM (born 1 May 1977) is a Trinidad and Tobago former professional footballer who played as a midfielder. He captained the Trinidad and Tobago national team.

As a member of the Trinidad and Tobago squad that competed at the 2006 FIFA World Cup in Germany, Whitley was awarded the Chaconia Medal (Gold Class), the second highest state decoration of Trinidad and Tobago.

Club career
Whitley played for San Juan Jabloteh for nine years in the TT Pro League prior to his contract termination in September 2007 after comments by manager Terry Fenwick regarding the player's attendance at practices. Several days later, he was signed by rival club W Connection where he remains to date (as of July 2008). His previous clubs include Superstar Rangers and Vitoria Setubal.

International career
Whitley made his international debut for the Trinidad and Tobago national football team (T&T) on 15 November 2005 in a 2006 FIFA World Cup Qualifier against Panama. He played most of T&T's qualification matches for the 2006 FIFA World Cup in Germany when T&T qualified, its first ever qualification. He played at the World Cup in all of T&T three games. He was absent from the national team for all of 2007 along with other World Cup players due to a dispute over bonuses with the Trinidad and Tobago Football Federation. He returned to the national team as captain for a friendly match against El Salvador in March 2008 and has retained the captain's armband for all games since (as of July 2008).

International goals
Scores and results list Trinidad and Tobago's goal tally first, score column indicates score after each Whitley goal.

References

External links
 

1977 births
Living people
Trinidad and Tobago footballers
Association football midfielders
Trinidad and Tobago international footballers
2002 CONCACAF Gold Cup players
2005 CONCACAF Gold Cup players
2006 FIFA World Cup players
San Juan Jabloteh F.C. players
W Connection F.C. players
TT Pro League players
St. Ann's Rangers F.C. players
Vitória F.C. players
Trinidad and Tobago expatriate footballers
Trinidad and Tobago expatriate sportspeople in Portugal
Expatriate footballers in Portugal
Recipients of the Chaconia Medal